Cerium(III) hydroxide is a hydroxide of the rare-earth metal cerium. It is a pale white powder with the chemical formula Ce(OH)3.

Preparation
Cerium(III) hydroxide is prepared by the reaction of hot water at 90 °C on cerium metal:
{2Ce} + 6H2O ->[{}\atop{90^\circ \ce C}] 2Ce(OH)3(v) + 3H2{\uparrow}

References

Hydroxides
Cerium(III) compounds